This is a comprehensive listing of official releases by CeCe Winans, an American gospel singer.

Albums

Studio albums

Live albums

Compilation albums

Other albums

Guest appearances and soundtracks
1994: "Rest in Me" Coram Deo II: People Of Praise (Sparrow)
1996: "Count On Me" with Whitney Houston Waiting To Exhale (Arista)
1996: "Take Me Back" Tribute: The Songs Of Andrae Crouch (Warner Alliance)
1997: "All Is Well Tonight" God With Us: A Celebration Of Christmas Carols... (Sparrow)
1998: "The River" The Prince of Egypt (Inspirational) (DreamWorks)
1998: "Humanity" The Prince of Egypt Soundtrack  (DreamWorks)
2000: "Tonight Tonight" BeBe Winans (featuring CeCe) (Motown)
2006: "He Set My Life To Music" Barbara Mandrell She Was Country When Country Wasn't Cool (BNA)
2006: "Walking Away" The Gospel According to Patti LaBelle (Umbrella)
2008: "Right Now (We Need Another)" BeBe & CeCe Winans with Vince Gill and Wynonna Judd (Zomba Recording)

References

Discographies of American artists
Rhythm and blues discographies
Soul music discographies
Christian music discographies